Adpar, formerly Trefhedyn, is a village in Ceredigion, Wales, in the community of Llandyfriog, now considered as a part of Newcastle Emlyn to which it is joined by a bridge across the River Teifi. In ancient times Adpar was a borough in its own right.

History
The Royal Commission on the Ancient and Historical Monuments of Wales records a "possible medieval castle motte" within the village. The mound is low, about 3.5 metres in height and damaged in subsequent periods.

At one time Adpar was relatively more important than it is now. It was an ancient borough, returned its own member of parliament, and had a Portreeve and two bailiffs. It had a market and several seasonal animal fairs. Several industrial enterprises used the fast-flowing waters of the River Teifi for power, including a woollen mill that produced flannel, blankets and knitting yarn. There was also a fishing weir above the bridge to catch migratory salmon.

The first permanent printing press was established in Adpar in 1719 by Isaac Carter (printer and native of Carmarthenshire). It is believed that the first two publications from this press were Welsh language Cân o Senn i’w hen Feistr Tobacco ("song from Senn to his old master, tobacco") by Alban Thomas and Cân ar Fesur Triban ynghylch Cydwybod a’i Chynheddfau ("Song in triplet measure concerning conscience and its qualities"). The press was transferred to Carmarthen in about 1725.

The last duel that took place in Cardiganshire occurred in Adpar in 1814. The last recorded use of stocks in the United Kingdom was in Adpar in 1872.

Notable people
In birth order:
John Elwyn (1916–1997), British painter, illustrator and educator

References

Villages in Ceredigion